The 1975 Philadelphia mayoral election saw the reelection of Frank Rizzo.

Rizzo defeated African American leader Charles W. Boweser, who led an independent campaign, and Republican nominee Tom Foglietta.

Democratic primary

Candidates

Declared
 Louis G. Hill, State Senator from the 36th district
 Muhammad Kenyatta, activist
 Frank Rizzo, incumbent Mayor

Results

Republican primary

Candidates

Declared
 Thomas Foglietta, At-large City Councilman

Results
Foglietta was unopposed for the Republican nomination.

Independents and third parties

Independent
 Charles Bowser, former Deputy Mayor

General election

Results

References

1975
Philadelphia
1975 Pennsylvania elections
1970s in Philadelphia